Lostman Go to Yesterday is a singles/b-sides collection by The Pillows, covering the period they were with King Records. It features fifty-seven songs on five discs and the twenty-one music videos for the singles on a DVD that is packaged with the discs.

Tracks 

The Pillows video albums
2007 video albums
The Pillows compilation albums
2007 compilation albums
Music video compilation albums